Rodolfo Paleotti (died 1619) was a Roman Catholic prelate who served as Bishop of Imola (1611–1619).

Biography
On 27 June 1611, Rodolfo Paleotti was appointed during the papacy of Pope Paul V as Bishop of Imola.
On 2 July 1611, he was consecrated bishop by Giovanni Garzia Mellini, Cardinal-Priest of Santi Quattro Coronati, with Marco Antonio Salomone, Bishop Emeritus of Sora, and Alessandro Borghi (bishop), Bishop Emeritus of Sansepolcro, serving as co-consecrators. 
He was installed on 15 October 1611.
He served as Bishop of Imola until his death on 24 May 1619.

While bishop, he was the principal co-consecrator of Gilles de Souvre, Bishop of Comminges (1617).

References

External links and additional sources
 (for Chronology of Bishops) 
 (for Chronology of Bishops) 

17th-century Italian Roman Catholic bishops
Bishops appointed by Pope Paul V
1619 deaths